The 2015 European Cadet Judo Championships is an edition of the European Cadet Judo Championships, organised by the International Judo Federation. It was held in Sofia, Bulgaria from 3 to 5 July 2015. The final day of competition featured the inaugural European cadet team championships events. The men's event was won by Team Georgia. Team Russia won the women's event.

Medal summary

Medal table

Men's events

Women's events

Source Results

References

External links
 

 U18
European Cadet Judo Championships
European Championships, U18
Judo
Judo competitions in Bulgaria
Judo
Judo, European Championships U18